Laughter is a 1930 American pre-Code comedy film directed by Harry d'Abbadie d'Arrast and starring Nancy Carroll, Fredric March and Frank Morgan. It was shot at the Astoria Studios in New York.

The film was nominated for an Academy Award for Best Story.

A copy has been preserved at the Library of Congress.

In 1931, a German-language version called The Men Around Lucy was released starring Liane Haid and Lien Deyers. This film is considered lost.

Plot
Peggy is a Follies dancer who forsakes her life of carefree attachments in order to meet her goal of marrying a millionaire. Alas, her elderly husband, broker C. Mortimer Gibson, is a well-meaning bore, and soon Peggy begins seeking entertainment elsewhere.

A year after their marriage, three significant events occur almost simultaneously. Peggy's former boyfriend, Paul Lockridge, a composer and pianist who is in love with her and seems to have a funny quip for every occasion, returns from Paris. She reunites with him as he offers her his companionship as a diversion from her stuffy life. Also, Ralph Le Saint, a young devil-may-care sculptor who is still in love with Peggy, plans his suicide in a mood of bitterness, and Gibson's daughter, Marjorie, returns from schooling abroad. Marjorie is soon paired with Ralph, and the romance that develops between them is paralleled by the adult affair between Peggy and Paul.

Ralph and Marjorie's escapades result in considerable trouble for Mortimer, while Paul implores Peggy to go to Paris with him, declaring "You are rich--dirty rich. You are dying. You need laughter to make you clean," but she refuses. When Marjorie plans to elope with Ralph, Peggy exposes the sculptor as a fortune hunter; and, dejected, he commits suicide. As a result, Peggy confesses her unhappiness to Gibson, then joins Paul and laughter in Paris.

Reception
In 1998, Jonathan Rosenbaum of the Chicago Reader included the film in his unranked list of the best American films not included on the AFI Top 100.

References

External links
 

1930 films
1930 comedy films
American comedy films
1930s English-language films
Films with screenplays by Herman J. Mankiewicz
Paramount Pictures films
American black-and-white films
Films shot at Astoria Studios
Films directed by Harry d'Abbadie d'Arrast
1930s American films